The 2018–19 Big Bash League season or BBL|08 was the eighth season of the KFC Big Bash League, the professional men's Twenty20 domestic cricket competition in Australia. The tournament started on 19 December 2018. Adelaide Strikers were the defending champions. The competition was extended to a full home and away season for the first time, with each team to play each other twice at both a home venue and away venue. This consists of 56 regular season matches, two semi-final fixtures and the final. For this season of the tournament, the toss was replaced by a bat flip, with "roofs and flats" used instead of heads or tails.

The season saw Cameron Bancroft's return to professional cricket, following his involvement in the ball-tampering scandal in March 2018.

The title was won by Melbourne Renegades, who defeated Melbourne Stars at the Marvel Stadium.

Teams

Venues

Points table

Fixtures

Round 1

Match 1

Match 2

Match 3

Match 4

Round 2

Match 5

Match 6

Match 7

Match 8

Round 3

Match 9

Match 10

Match 11

Match 12

Round 4

Match 13

Match 14

Match 15

Match 16

Round 5

Match 17

Match 18

Match 19

Match 20

Round 6

Match 21

Match 22

Match 23

Match 24

Round 7

Match 25

Match 26

Match 27

Match 28

Round 8

Match 29

Match 30

Match 31

Match 32

Round 9

Match 33

Match 34

Match 35

Match 36

Round 10

Match 37

Match 38

Match 39

Match 40

Round 11

Match 41

Match 42

Match 43

Match 44

Round 12

Match 45

Match 46

Match 47

Match 48

Round 13

Match 49

Match 50

Match 51

Match 52

Round 14

Match 53

Match 54

Match 55

Match 56

Knockout Phase

Semi-finals

Semi-final 1

Semi-final 2

Final

Statistics

Most Runs

Most Wickets

Attendances

TV audience
This was the first BBL season featuring the new cricket broadcasting rights deal made between Cricket Australia, Fox Sports Australia and Seven Network. Fox Sports broadcast all 59 matches from the BBL season on their new Fox Cricket channel, with 16 of those broadcast exclusively. Channel Seven will be broadcasting 43 matches, including all finals fixtures. For these 43 matches Channel Seven were the “Host Broadcaster” and did the toss and player of the match.

  League matches broadcast by both Fox Cricket and Channel Seven.
  League matches broadcast exclusively by Fox Cricket.
  Semi-finals and final broadcast by both Fox Cricket and Channel Seven.

See also

2018–19 Women's Big Bash League season

References

External links
 Official website

Big Bash League seasons
Big Bash League
Big Bash League
2018–19 Big Bash League